Codrington may refer to:

Places
 Codrington, Barbuda
 Barbuda Codrington Airport
 Codrington Lagoon
 Codrington, Gloucestershire, England
 Codrington, Ontario, Canada
 Codrington, Victoria, Australia
 Codrington Wind Farm, Victoria
 Mount Codrington, Antarctica

Institutions
 Codrington College, Anglican theological college in St. John, Barbados
 Codrington Library, All Souls College, Oxford, England

People with the surname
 Codrington baronets
 Austin Codrington (born 1975), Jamaican cricketer
Christopher Codrington (died 1698), British plantation owner and colonial administrator, founder of Codrington in Barbuda
 Christopher Codrington (1668–1710), British soldier and plantation owner in Barbados
Christopher Codrington (1764–1843), from 1797 known as Christopher Bethell-Codrington, British member of Parliament and sugar planter
Christopher William Codrington (1805–1864), British member of parliament
 Sir Edward Codrington, (1770–1851), British admiral
 George Codrington (born 1966), Canadian cricketer
 Henry Codrington (1808–1877), British rear-admiral
 Isabel Codrington (1874–1943), British artist
 Jaidon Codrington (born 1984), American boxer
 Robert Edward Codrington (1869–1908), British colonial administrator in North-Western and North-Eastern Rhodesia (now Zambia and Malawi)
 Robert Henry Codrington, (1830–1922), British Anglican priest and anthropologist
 Thomas Codrington (1829–1918), British engineer and antiquarian
 Thomas Codrington (priest) (died  1691), English Catholic theologian
 Vinny Codrington (born 1956), British cricket administrator and former rugby union player
 William Codrington (British Army officer) (1804–1884), British general and politician
 John Codrington Bampfylde (1754 –  1796), English poet

Other uses
 , a Royal Navy A-class destroyer